Old Country Road is a  major east–west thoroughfare through central Nassau County and extending into western Suffolk County on Long Island, New York. It serves many of the major shopping centers in central Nassau County including Roosevelt Field Mall. The road also forms part of the border between the towns of Hempstead and North Hempstead. In Nassau County, Old Country Road is county-maintained as the unsigned County Route 25 (CR 25) west of Round Swamp Road. This road follows the boundary line separating the towns of Hempstead and North Hempstead.

Route description
Old Country Road begins as the north–south Herricks Road (unsigned CR 8) curves to the east. It passes by the Nassau County government buildings in Mineola and northern Garden City around its intersection with Mineola Boulevard/Franklin Avenue (unsigned CR 5A). It then crosses Glen Cove Road/Clinton Road (unsigned CR 1), passing by a series of major shopping centers in Carle Place and Westbury including Roosevelt Field Mall and The Mall at the Source. It passes through Hicksville just south of where the concurrency between NY 106 and NY 107 ends. It intersects NY 135 in Plainview and briefly overlaps Round Swamp Road (unsigned CR 110) before continuing into western Suffolk County.

Old Country Road overlaps Round Swamp Road before crossing the Nassau-Suffolk County Line at the same time as the Long Island Expressway at exit 48. The route has a junction with NY 110 in Melville. Between Foxhurst Road and CR 35 the Dix Hills Road bridge goes over both Old Country Road and Northern State Parkway in Dix Hills. A connecting road between Old Country & Dix Hills Road exists. The road ends at a junction with NY 25.

Route marker 

In the mid-1970s, Nassau County officials opted to remove all county route signs instead of funding replacements that were compliant with the federal government's Manual on Uniform Traffic Control Devices.

Major intersections

See also

List of county routes in Nassau County, New York

References

External links

Old Country Road (AlpsRoads)

Transportation in Nassau County, New York
Transportation in Suffolk County, New York